Bibi Kand (also Romanized as Bībī Kand; also known as Bībī Kandī) is a village in Mahmudabad Rural District, in the Central District of Shahin Dezh County, West Azerbaijan Province, Iran. At the 2006 census, its population was 277, in 46 families.

References 

Populated places in Shahin Dezh County